The Valley Journal Advertiser is a weekly newspaper serving Annapolis, Kings and Hants counties in Nova Scotia. It was formed in 2016 by merging the formerly separate Hants Journal and Kings County Advertiser; although the two publications produce a single merged print edition covering both counties, website content remains targeted to each county under the separate titles.

The Hants Journal began publication in 1867 as the Saturday Mail, taking the name Hants Journal in 1870.

It has a circulation of under 2500.

See also
List of newspapers in Canada

Notes

External links
 
 Vital statistics from Hants Journal (1898–1911)

Weekly newspapers published in Nova Scotia
Hants County, Nova Scotia
SaltWire Network publications
Publications established in 1867
1867 establishments in Nova Scotia